Chaz Mostert (born 10 April 1992) is an Australian professional racing driver competing in the Repco Supercars Championship. He currently drives the No. 25 Ford Mustang GT for Walkinshaw Andretti United. Mostert was the winner of the 2021 Bathurst 1000 with Lee Holdsworth and has also previously won the 2014 Bathurst 1000 with Paul Morris and the 2010 Australian Formula Ford Championship.

Early career
Mostert, who grew up in Browns Plains near Brisbane, commenced kart racing at age seven in Ipswich and the Gold Coast. 

Mostert progressed into Formula Ford in 2008. He finished 11th in the 2008 Australian Formula Ford Championship, fourth in 2009 and then won the 2010 Australian Formula Ford Championship with a record of the most race wins in a season.

Touring cars

Development Series

In 2010 Chaz Mostert got the chance to drive a Miles Racing Ford BF Falcon at Bathurst in the Fujitsu V8 Supercar Series. Mostert finished 6th and 4th in the two races, leading to a deal with Miles Racing for the 2011 season. Again, he performed strongly for the team, particularly in wet conditions. Ford Performance Racing signed him for the final two rounds at Sandown and Homebush to drive the team's first Development Series car, a FG Falcon. Mostert scored a pole position on debut for the team at Sandown and took three race podiums in the final two rounds. Mostert's performances earned him the Mike Kable Young Gun Award at the end of 2011.

2012 saw Mostert continue with Ford Performance Racing in the Development Series. At the first round, the Adelaide 500, Mostert took pole and clean swept the weekend with two race wins, one of two round wins in the season. He finished third in the championship in what was considered one of the strongest ever Development Series fields, with Scott McLaughlin, Scott Pye and Nick Percat rounding out the championship top four. On 1 December 2012 Mostert was awarded an Honorary commission as a Lieutenant in the Royal Australian Navy. He was presented with his commission by the Chief of Navy Vice Admiral Raymond Griggs.

In 2013, Mostert again won the Adelaide 500 round of the Development Series, now driving for MW Motorsport. Before the second round, Mostert had been called up to V8 Supercars and did not take any further part in the championship.

Supercars Championship

Dick Johnson Racing
Mostert's V8 Supercars debut was at the Perth 360 at Barbagallo Raceway for Dick Johnson Racing, replacing Jonny Reid in the seat. As part of the deal, Ford Performance Racing provided additional technical support to the team and retained a long-term deal with Mostert. On 28 July 2013, at only his fifth championship event, Mostert won his first race at the Ipswich 360 at Queensland Raceway. Ironically, the podium was rounded out by the two Ford Performance Racing entries. Mostert took one further podium at Winton and finished 17th in the championship despite missing the opening rounds. Mostert also commenced a love-hate relationship at the Bathurst 1000 by heavily crashing in Friday practice and requiring an overnight rebuild.

Ford Performance Racing
In 2014, he replaced Will Davison at Ford Performance Racing in Pepsi Max colours. Adam DeBorre remained as his engineer, transferring back to Ford Performance Racing from his spell at Dick Johnson Racing with Mostert. One year after his debut, Mostert won his second championship race at Barbagallo, also winning the round. In October 2014, Mostert won the 2014 Bathurst 1000 with co-driver Paul Morris, after overtaking the low-on-fuel Jamie Whincup on the final lap. Mostert and Morris had started at the back of the grid after being excluded from qualifying, the lowest ever starting position to win the Bathurst 1000. Mostert finished the 2014 championship in seventh place.

Prodrive Racing Australia
In 2015, Ford Performance Racing lost their factory Ford support and renamed to Prodrive Racing Australia. They also launched the Ford FG X Falcon and Mostert and team-mate Mark Winterbottom proved to be the main championship contenders. Mostert won a race each at Winton (crashing out of the lead in the other race), Hidden Valley and Queensland Raceway and two at Sydney Motorsport Park, and after a second-place finish at the Sandown 500 was 198 points behind Winterbottom heading into the Bathurst 1000. Then, in Friday qualifying for the 2015 Bathurst 1000, Mostert was involved in a horrific crash on the approach to Forrest's Elbow, leaving him with a broken leg and a broken wrist and ruling him out for the remainder of the season. Mostert's wrecked car now resides at the National Motor Racing Museum near the circuit.

Rod Nash Racing
In 2016 and 2017, Mostert drove under the Rod Nash Racing moniker, a satellite team of Prodrive Racing Australia, and now with the support of Supercheap Auto. In the first event of his return from his 2015 crash, Mostert took pole position for the Sunday race at the Adelaide 500, an achievement he ranked at the time as only second to his Bathurst 1000 win. Despite four more poles during the season, Mostert didn't take a victory and finished seventh in the championship, one place behind team-mate Winterbottom.

In 2017 Mostert broke his victory drought with three wins. The first of which was the Saturday race of the Phillip Island 500, before further wins at Queensland Raceway and the Gold Coast 600. The win at the Gold Coast helped Mostert, with co-driver Steve Owen, to win the first Enduro Cup for both the team and for Ford.

Tickford Racing
In 2018, another reshuffle of Prodrive Racing Australia saw them, and the Rod Nash Racing entry, renamed to Tickford Racing. However, the team had a difficult season and Mostert only took one victory, another win at the Gold Coast 600. 

In 2019, Tickford Racing upgraded to the new Ford Mustang GT. He had a moderately successful year, with a single win at Albert Park and several podiums. He was unable to race at the Gold Coast, after he wrote off his car during the Top 10 Shootout on Saturday.

Walkinshaw Andretti United 
On the 26th of November, Chaz announced that he was leaving Tickford Racing, after being with the team for seven years, and switched not only teams, but brands, to Walkinshaw Andretti United and Holden for the 2020 season.

On the 15th of June 2021, Chaz signed a long-term contract extension to the end of the 2023 season with Walkinshaw Andretti United. He then went on to win the 2021 Darwin Triple Crown later that week.

On the 7th of November 2021, During the second 2021 Sydney SuperNight Race 25, Chaz heroically drove from last on the grid 26th in a downpour night race to go on and finish on the Podium in 3rd place.

Mostert set a new Bathurst 1000 lap record of 2:03.3736 on the 4th of December 2021 during the Top 10 Shootout qualifier while driving a Walkinshaw Andretti United Holden ZB Commodore.

Production cars

In 2011, Mostert competed in the Bathurst 12 Hour in a HSV VXR Turbo, finishing third in class with Ashley Walsh and Gerard McLeod. 

In 2016 Mostert, driving with Nathan Morcom, won the inaugural Bathurst 6 Hour race for Group 3E Series Production Cars, driving a BMW 335i E92.

GT
Mostert's GT career launched from further entries in the GT3 class of the Bathurst 12 Hour, starting in 2017 in a customer MARC Cars Australia BMW M6 GT3. Mostert qualified a surprise second on the grid and led the early stages of the race before technical issues struck down the car. Mostert's performance led to a call up to drive for the factory-supported Schnitzer Motorsport in 2018 and 2019. In 2018, he went one better in qualifying, taking the Allan Simonsen Pole Position Trophy, and once again started the race strongly before being involved in an incident in lapped traffic at the start of Conrod Straight.

Mostert has also been given opportunities in GT3 and LM GTE races overseas for BMW. In GT3, this has included two class victories in Asian Le Mans Series in the 2017-18 season and a fifth-place finish in the 2017 FIA GT World Cup at the Guia Circuit in Macau. In GTE, Mostert has entered the Rahal Letterman Lanigan Racing BMW M8 GTE at Petit Le Mans in 2018 and the 24 Hours of Daytona in 2019.

Career results

Supercars Championship results
(Races in bold indicate pole position) (Races in italics indicate fastest lap)

TCR Australia results 
(Races in bold indicate pole position) (Races in italics indicate fastest lap)

Complete Bathurst 1000 results

Complete Bathurst 12 Hour results

Complete Daytona 24 Hour results

References

External links
 Chaz Mostert V8 Supercars Official Profile
 Driver Database profile
 Profile on Racing Reference
 Official Website

1992 births
Living people
Australian racing drivers
Formula Ford drivers
Supercars Championship drivers
V8SuperTourer drivers
Bathurst 1000 winners
WeatherTech SportsCar Championship drivers
24 Hours of Daytona drivers
Sportspeople from Logan, Queensland
Andretti Autosport drivers
United Autosports drivers
Dick Johnson Racing drivers
BMW M drivers
Rahal Letterman Lanigan Racing drivers
Rowe Racing drivers
Schnitzer Motorsport drivers